Christopher Addison, 1st Viscount Addison,  (19 June 1869 – 11 December 1951), was a British medical doctor and politician. A member of the Liberal and Labour parties, he served as Minister of Munitions during the First World War and was later Minister of Health under David Lloyd George and Leader of the House of Lords under Clement Attlee.

He was a prominent anatomist and perhaps the most eminent doctor ever to enter the Commons. He was a leader in issues of health, wartime munitions, housing  and agriculture. Although not highly visible, he played a major role in the post war governments after both world wars. Addison worked hard to promote the National Insurance scheme in 1911. Lloyd George made him the first Minister of Health when the department was created in 1919, and Addison oversaw an expansion of council housing after the Great War with an increase in public funding to local authority housing schemes with the Housing, Town Planning, &c. Act 1919. He later joined the Labour Party.

Background and education
Addison was born in the rural parish of Hogsthorpe in Lincolnshire, the son of Robert Addison and Susan, daughter of Charles Fanthorpe. His family had owned and run a farm for several generations and he maintained a strong interest in agriculture and rural matters throughout his life. He attended Trinity College, Harrogate, from the age of thirteen. He trained in medicine at Sheffield School of Medicine and St Bartholomew's Hospital in London. His education was expensive for his family, and he insisted on re-paying his parents once he had begun his career.

In 1892, Addison graduated from the University of London as a Bachelor of Medicine and Science with honours in forensic medicine. A year later he qualified as a Medical Doctor and two years after that he was elected a Fellow of the Royal College of Surgeons. He combined private practice with academic research, and taught anatomy at Sheffield School of Medicine. In 1896 he became professor of anatomy at the newly formed University College of Sheffield, and edited the Quarterly Medical Journal from 1898 to 1901. In 1901, he moved to London again, teaching at Charing Cross Hospital. He published his research on anatomy and became Hunterian professor with the Royal College of Surgeons.

Addison's principal contributions to anatomy were in his writings in three volumes of the Journal of Anatomy, 1899–1901, "On the topographical anatomy of the abdominal viscera in man". Subsequently, he contributed to the three-dimensional mapping of the abdomen, which was based on numerous bodily measurements, “some 10,000 measurements made on forty bodies”. He linked his measurements to an imaginary plane of section, known as "Addison's transpyloric plane".

Political career

1907–1914
Motivated by concern for the treatment of the poor, and that the effects of poverty on health could be fought only by governments, not by doctors, Addison entered politics. He was adopted as Liberal candidate for Hoxton, Shoreditch, in 1907, and was duly elected in the January 1910 general election.

The Chancellor of the Exchequer, David Lloyd George, noted Addison's medical background and asked him to speak in support of the 1911 National Insurance Bill, both in Parliament and with the British Medical Association. In August 1914, he was appointed Parliamentary Secretary to the Board of Education, under Jack Pease. His work here was largely concerned with improving the health and welfare of children, but was cut short following the outbreak of the First World War.

World War
Addison became Parliamentary Secretary to the Ministry of Munitions in May 1915.

Addison introduced a degree of intervention in the free market known as "War Socialism" to prompt faster munitions production. Private enterprise in key sectors was brought under the control of government, which erected its own factories, and great care was taken to improve the welfare of the munitions workers, both male and female. Ammunition supply-lines dictated the tempo of the war, especially in the first year of fighting, so stability and productivity within this industry were of the utmost importance. The government subsidised housing estates, such as Vickerstown on Walney Island (now in Cumbria), with integral religious, social and recreational amenities, to enable pools of munitions workers and their families to move next to expanded armament factories. Raymond Unwin, an influential civil servant from this, time injected some of the late Victorian/utopian/Fabian philosophy of garden suburbs and ideals from the cheap cottages movement launched in 1905.

With hindsight, this may be seen as something of a prototype of the municipal housing that followed in the post-war period and the beginnings of town planning as an accepted concern of the state. Fellow idealists might well have regretted the design, layout and landscaping compromises inevitably struck in the pursuit of rapid construction to support homeland defence as an over-riding priority. Improved dimensions of kitchens, bathrooms and gardens for working-class houses might also be seen as a response to a more equal valuation of women as competent industrial workers and a political force.

The Ministry of Munitions was a new Ministry, created and headed by David Lloyd George to rapidly improve and increase production of munitions. Working conditions were improved in the new, state-owned industry, and Addison created and implemented schemes that greatly increased the efficiency of production. He became a Privy Counsellor and was promoted to Minister of Munitions when Lloyd George became Minister of War in July 1916. He supported Lloyd George against the Prime Minister, H. H. Asquith, at the end of 1916, and continued into the new coalition cabinet.

Postwar planning
In July 1917, he became a Minister Without Portfolio with responsibility for analysing the problems that Britain would face after the war and preparing plans for reconstruction. He worked with Arthur Greenwood to develop programmes for sweeping social reforms. Perhaps Addison's greatest achievement was the establishment of a costing system which by the end of the war had saved an estimated £440 million.

Addison's Hoxton constituency was abolished for the 1918 general election, when he was elected for the new Shoreditch constituency.

Although Lloyd George was increasingly influenced by the Conservative members of his coalition government, Addison's plans formed the basis of much post-war legislation. Addison became President of the Local Government Board in January 1919, with the goal of transforming it into a Ministry of Health. He became the first Minister of Health in June following the passing of the Ministry of Health Act 1919. He was responsible for a great deal of public health improvements and social legislation.  He ensured the extension of health and hospital services: increasing the treatment provision for communicable diseases such as venereal diseases and tuberculosis; increasing provision for maternal health and infant welfare  as well home nursing. He successfully introduced the Nurse Registration Act 1919, establishing for the first time a register of nurses under the auspices of the General Nursing Council.  He introduced the first Housing and Town Planning Act, under which the state built low-rent homes (council houses) for the working-class. Addison also reviewed and increased the provisions of the National Insurance system, and introduced programmes to improve healthcare and training. However, he presided over large increases in public spending and this raised the ire of Conservatives in the government. He was moved from the Ministry of Health in April 1921, becoming Minister Without Portfolio. Addison resigned in July 1921 when a Cabinet committee decided to halt the housing construction scheme altogether; he subsequently became a strong critic of the government.

1922–1937
Addison lost his seat in the 1922 general election. Since the end of the war, he had found himself increasingly detached from both warring factions of the Liberal Party. His belief in social reform and progressive policies brought him close to the socialism of the Labour Party, and he campaigned for Labour candidates at the 1923 general election.

During this time he returned to his family farm and published a number of books, including The Betrayal of the Slums, on the link between poor housing and poor health, and Practical Socialism. He stood unsuccessfully as Labour's candidate in the constituency of Hammersmith South for the 1924 general election, before winning the Swindon constituency in Wiltshire, at the 1929 general election. Ramsay MacDonald appointed Addison as Parliamentary Secretary to the Ministry of Agriculture in 1929. He served under Noel Buxton, and succeeded him as Minister of Agriculture in June 1930. He worked with Clement Attlee, the future Leader of the Labour party with whom he formed a close relationship, and was an active member of the Socialist Medical Association.

Facing economic crisis in 1931, the Chancellor of the Exchequer, Philip Snowden, proposed swingeing cuts to public spending, particularly to unemployment benefit. Addison voted against these cuts in cabinet and went into Opposition when MacDonald formed a National Government with the Conservatives and Liberals. Addison lost his seat at the 1931 general election. In 1934 he regained his Swindon seat in a by-election, but lost it a second time at the 1935 general election. During the Spanish Civil War he helped organise medical aid to Spain, as president of the Spanish Medical Aid Committee.

1937–1951
In May 1937, Addison joined the Labour party's meagre caucus in the House of Lords, being raised to the peerage as Baron Addison, of Stallingborough in the County of Lincoln. He was Chairman of the Buckinghamshire War Agricultural Committee during the Second World War, co-ordinating agricultural production and supply in that county. Attlee appointed Addison to be Labour's leader in the Lords in 1940, after Lord Snell stepped down for health reasons. Addison retained this position until his death, serving as Leader of the House of Lords following Labour's victory in the 1945 general election. He was created Viscount Addison, of Stallingborough in the County of Lincoln, in July 1945.

As Leader of the House of Lords, Addison had the key responsibility of steering government legislation through the upper chamber. He formed a good relationship with the leader of the Conservative opposition in the Lords, the Marquess of Salisbury. Through general consultation, Addison developed new guidelines for peers, particularly with regard to declaration of interests. He was also Secretary of State for Dominion Affairs in Attlee's first cabinet, directing the transformation of the Dominion Affairs Office into the Office of Commonwealth Relations and playing an instrumental role in Labour's early anti-imperialist policies and the strengthening of the British Commonwealth. In 1946, he became the first Labour politician to be made a Knight of the Garter. As his health began to deteriorate he withdrew from foreign affairs in 1947, subsequently holding a number of sinecure positions in combination with his leadership of the Lords, until Labour lost office in October 1951.  As a result of Addison's success in steering legislation through the House of Lords, the Attlee ministry issued few major reforms to the institution beyond limiting its delaying power to one year during its time in power.

Family
Lord Addison married firstly Isobel, daughter of Archibald Gray, in 1902. They had two daughters and three sons. Isobel, the daughter of a wealthy Scottish businessman and shipping agent, supported her husband morally and financially when he embarked upon a career in politics. After her death in 1934 Addison married secondly Dorothy, daughter of Frederick Percy Low, in 1937. Lord Addison died in December 1951, aged 82, only two months after the end of his political career. He was succeeded in his titles by his eldest son, Christopher. Lady Addison died in September 1982.

Selected publications
Addison wrote an important paper, "On the Topographical Anatomy of the Abdominal Viscera in Man, especially the Gastro-Intestinal Canal", that was published in four parts in the Journal of Anatomy and Physiology between 1899 and 1901:
 Part I. July 1899, Vol. 33 (Part 4), 565.5.
 Part II. July 1900, Vol. 34 (Part 4), 427–450.9.
 Part III. January 1901, Vol. 35 (Part 2), 166–204.11.  
 Part IV. April 1901, Vol. 35 (Part 3), 277–304.9.

Commemoration 
Addison cut the first sod for Bristol City Council's new Sea Mills estate on 4 June 1919. An oak tree was planted by city's lady mayoress as part of the same event, it survives and is known as the Addison Tree. Over 90 streets are named after Addison across Britain, all in areas of social housing.

Arms

See also
People's Union for Economy

References

Further reading
 Cooter, Roger. "The rise and decline of the medical member: Doctors and Parliament in Edwardian and Interwar Britain." Bulletin of the History of Medicine 78#1 (2004): 59–107.
 Honigsbaum, Frank. "Christopher Addison: a realist in pursuit of dreams." Clio medica (Amsterdam, Netherlands) 23 (1993): 229–246.  reprinted in Dorothy Porter, and Roy Porter, eds. Doctors, Politics and Society: Historical Essays (1993) pp  229–46.
 Morgan, Kenneth O., and Jane Morgan. Portrait of a progressive: the political career of Christopher, Viscount Addison (Oxford University Press, 1980).

External links 
 
 Materials relating to the life of Lord Addison 

1869 births
1951 deaths
19th-century English medical doctors
20th-century English medical doctors
Agriculture ministers of the United Kingdom
Alumni of the Medical College of St Bartholomew's Hospital
Alumni of the University of Sheffield
British Secretaries of State for Dominion Affairs
British Secretaries of State
Fellows of the Royal College of Surgeons
Foreign Office personnel of World War II
Hackney Members of Parliament
Knights of the Garter
Labour Party (UK) MPs for English constituencies
Labour Party (UK) hereditary peers
Leaders of the House of Lords
Liberal Party (UK) MPs for English constituencies
Lord Presidents of the Council
Lords Privy Seal
Members of the Privy Council of the United Kingdom
Ministers in the Attlee governments, 1945–1951
UK MPs 1910
UK MPs 1910–1918
UK MPs 1918–1922
UK MPs 1929–1931
UK MPs 1931–1935
UK MPs who were granted peerages
United Kingdom Paymasters General
Christopher 1
Barons created by George VI
Viscounts created by George VI